The 2011 Città di Caltanissetta was a professional tennis tournament played on clay courts. It was the thirteenth edition of the tournament which was part of the 2011 ATP Challenger Tour. It took place in Caltanissetta, Italy between 21 and 27 March 2011.

Singles main draw entrants

Seeds

 Rankings are as of March 7, 2011.

Other entrants
The following players received wildcards into the singles main draw:
  Daniele Bracciali
  Francesco Aldi
  Stefano Galvani
  Daniele Giorgini

The following players received entry from the qualifying draw:
  Enrico Burzi
  Aljaž Bedene
  Filippo Leonardi
  Antal van der Duim

Champions

Singles

 Andreas Haider-Maurer def.  Matteo Viola, 6–1, 7–6(1)

Doubles

 Daniele Bracciali /  Simone Vagnozzi def.  Daniele Giorgini /  Adrian Ungur, 3–6, 7–6(2), [10–7]

External links
Official Website
ITF Search
ATP official site

Citta di Caltanissetta
Clay court tennis tournaments
Città di Caltanissetta